Reservoir Songs is an EP recorded by the indie rock band Crooked Fingers and released in 2002. A five song EP which collects some of the band's favorite covers which they had been playing for the past couple of years on tour, it marks the first release for Crooked Fingers on the Merge Records label. It was recorded January 11–15, 2002 in Atlanta, GA and mastered by John Golden with additional production by Andy Baker.

Track listing
 "Sunday Morning Coming Down " (Kris Kristofferson)
 "Solitary Man" (Neil Diamond)
 "When You Were Mine" (Prince)
 "The River" (Bruce Springsteen)
 "Under Pressure" (Queen w/ Bowie)

Crooked Fingers albums
2002 EPs
Merge Records EPs
Covers EPs